Loitering with Intent is a novel by Scottish author Muriel Spark. Published in 1981 by The Bodley Head, it was short-listed for the Booker Prize that year. It contains many autobiographical references to Spark's early career and was reprinted in 2001 by New Directions, in the US, and in 2007 by Virago Press in the UK (with a foreword by Mark Lawson).

Plot introduction 
In London in 1949/1950, Fleur Talbot is struggling to complete her first novel, Warrender Chase. She manages to secure a job working for Sir Quentin Oliver as secretary to his Autobiographical Association, whose eccentric members are seeking to write their memoirs. (Being a Spark novel there is much play on the inter-relationship of texts, with Newman's Apologia and Cellini's Autobiography figuring as Fleur's essential reading.) Fleur assists them and begins to notice that parts of her novel start to occur in real life. Fleur becomes increasingly suspicious that Sir Quentin may be blackmailing, poisoning or corrupting the association's members. Sir Quentin meanwhile discovers Fleur's novel in progress and seeks to suppress it. Fact and fiction intertwine with Sir Quentin's fate matching the fate of the character Warrender Chase.

References

External links 
The Complete Review
Virago Press

1981 British novels
Novels by Muriel Spark
Novels set in London
Novels about writers
Fiction set in the 1950s
The Bodley Head books